Belye Kresty is a rural locality (a selo) and the administrative center of Belokrestskoye Rural Settlement, Chagodoshchensky District, Vologda Oblast, Russia. The population was 430 as of 2002. There are 9 streets.

Geography 
Sazonovo is the nearest rural locality.

References 

Rural localities in Chagodoshchensky District